Lago di Monate is a lake in the Province of Varese, Lombardy, Italy. At an elevation of 266 m, its surface area is 2.5 km².
The municipalities bordering the Lake are Cadrezzate, Comabbio, Osmate and Travedona-Monate.

Lakes of Lombardy